The history of the University of Calcutta began in 1857; it is the oldest of the modern universities in India.

Pre-independence (1857–1947)

The University of Calcutta was founded in 1857. Dr. Fredrick John, the education secretary to the then British Government in India, first tendered a proposal to the British Government in London for the establishment of a university in Calcutta, along the lines of London University, but at that time the plan failed to obtain the necessary approval. However, a proposal to establish two universities, one in Calcutta and the other in Bombay was later accepted in 1854 and the necessary authority was given through Wood's despatch. The Calcutta University Act came into force on 24 January 1857 and a 41-member Senate was formed as the policy making body of the university. When the university was first established it had a catchment area covering the area from Lahore to Rangoon (now in Myanmar)—the largest of any Indian university.

On 30 January 1858, the Syndicate of the Calcutta University started functioning. The first meeting of the Senate was held in the Council room of the Calcutta Medical College. A temporary office of the university was started in a few rented rooms in Camac Street. For several years afterwards the meetings of the Senate and Syndicate were held in a room of the Writers' building. 244 candidates appeared for the first Entrance Examination of the university, held in March 1861 in the Town Hall of Calcutta.

The first Chancellor and Vice-Chancellor of the Calcutta University were Governor General Lord Canning and Chief Justice of the Supreme Court, Sir William Colvile, respectively. In 1858, Joddu Nath Bose and Bankim Chandra Chatterjee became the first graduates of the university.

From 1860 to 1890, Government Science College, Jabalpur, the first science college of India, was affiliated to the University of Calcutta.

In 1862, a decision was taken by the Senate to construct for the university a building of its own.  Accordingly, the historical Senate Hall was constructed at a cost of Rs. 2,52,221/- and inaugurated on 12 March 1873 by holding the convocation of the university.

The university library was also started soon after.

1900-1947 
In 1914, the University College of Science or Rajabazar Science College was established. A centralized Post-Graduate system of teaching and research was started in 1917. The Asutoish building was opened in 1926. The Asutosh Museum of Indian Art started in 1937.

in 1937 when Dr. Syamaprasad Mookerjee was the Vice-Chancellor, he requested Rabindranath Tagore to compose a song to be adopted as the university song of the University of Calcutta. Tagore composed two songs instead of one. Later the second song, Subho Karmapathe Dharo Nirvayo Gaan was chosen to be the university song.

The Institute of Nuclear Physics, the first of its kind in Asia, was founded under the leadership of Meghnad Saha in 1945.

Post-independence (1947–present) 
In the year 2001 the University of Calcutta was awarded with the 'Five Star' status in the first cycle of the University's accreditation by the National Assessment and Accreditation Council (NAAC). In 2009 and 2017, the National Assessment and Accreditation Council (NAAC) awarded its highest grade of 'A' to the University of Calcutta in 2nd & 3rd cycle of the University's accreditation.

In 2019, the university's central library and 40 departmental libraries were opened to the general public.

Seals 

The first seal was adopted when the university was founded on 24 January 1857, when India was under company rule.

The second seal of the university was adopted after the formation of the British Raj. It features within it a coat of arms, with a lion and the St Edward's Crown at the crest, symbolizing the formation of the British Raj when India was brought under direct rule by the British Crown. It features a lion and unicorn as supporters, and the motto Dieu et mon droit at the bottom.

The third seal was used for a brief period of time in 1930. It features three elephants carrying a book.

The fourth, fifth, and sixth seals are very similar, and they all feature lotuses.

The seventh seal is currently used today.

References 

University of Calcutta
History of education in India
Academic institutions associated with the Bengal Renaissance
Calcutta